Brickerville is an unincorporated community in Lane County, Oregon, United States.

Route 36 used to be the main road from Florence on the Oregon Coast to Eugene in the Willamette Valley, but Oregon Route 126 now serves as the main route.

References 

Unincorporated communities in Lane County, Oregon
Unincorporated communities in Oregon